George Kaye may refer to:

 Harry Kaye (George Kaye), English footballer
 G. W. C. Kaye (George William Clarkson Kaye), English physicist

See also 
 George Kay, English footballer
 George Kay (minister), Scottish minister
 George Frederick Kay, American geologist